Alain Ernest Wertheimer (born 28 September 1948) is a French billionaire businessman, based in New York City. He is the chairman and a controlling shareholder in Chanel, with his brother Gérard who chairs its watch division. As of October 2022, Wertheimer's net worth was estimated at US$40 billion by Bloomberg Billionaires Index, making him the 26th richest person in the world.

Early life
Wertheimer was born on 28 September 1948, to a Jewish family, the son of Jacques Wertheimer and Eliane Fischer. His grandfather, Pierre, co-founded Chanel with Coco Chanel.

Career
Wertheimer is the co-owner and chairman of Chanel.

The privately held company is run by Alain who has presided over the acquisition of several non-Chanel brands, including Eres Lingerie and beachwear, Tanner Krolle saddles and leather goods, and Holland & Holland, a British gunmaker.

Based in France, the Wertheimer brothers own French vineyards including Château Rauzan-Ségla in Margaux, and Château Canon in Saint-Émilion, both of which have won rave reviews from oenophiles. 

Both brothers are enthusiastic equestrians who also inherited and operate an important Thoroughbred horse racing stable they call La Presle Farm or Wertheimer farm for racing in the United States and is known as Wertheimer et Frère partnership in France.

Personal life
Wertheimer is married, with three children, and lives in New York City.

Alain and his brothers own vineyards in France and Napa Valley, California.

See also 
 List of French billionaires by net worth

References

French businesspeople in fashion
1948 births
Living people
Chanel people
French billionaires
French chief executives
20th-century French Jews
French racehorse owners and breeders
20th-century French businesspeople
21st-century French businesspeople
Wertheimer family